The Buccaneers–Dolphins rivalry is between the Tampa Bay Buccaneers and Miami Dolphins of the National Football League. It is an in-state, interconference matchup between the two oldest NFL teams in the state of Florida. It has been active in most years since the Buccaneers joined the league as an expansion team in 1976. The rivalry is mostly a mainstay of the preseason, as the teams have been in different conferences since 1977 and as such only play each other during the regular season once every four years.

The Dolphins are part of the AFC East. The Buccaneers are currently part of the NFC South. According to the current NFL scheduling format, the two teams play each other every four years during the regular season, rotating the host site each meeting. However, with a new 17-game schedule being introduced in 2021, it is now possible for the two teams to meet as early as every other year, depending on division placement. In addition, the two clubs play each other during the preseason nearly every year, with the site rotating on a mostly regular basis.

The two teams have never met in the playoffs. Currently, the only circumstance in which the two teams could meet during the postseason would be in the Super Bowl.

The twelve regular season meetings have been characterized in most cases as relatively low-scoring affairs, and oftentimes close. Nine of the twelve have been decided by ten or fewer points, while six have been decided by a field goal.

Though the in-state rivalry has no official nickname, it has sometimes been referred to as the "Sunshine Series."

History

1970s
Tampa Bay joined the NFL as an expansion team in 1976, and immediately team officials were anxious to establish an in-state rivalry with the Miami Dolphins. The two-time Super Bowl winning Dolphins were the more popular and established team of the state, however, fans in the Tampa/St. Pete area were enthusiastic about finally having their own team to cheer for. In Tampa Bay's expansion season, they hosted the Dolphins at Tampa Stadium for a preseason game, in front of a record crowd of 67,466. The Dolphins won 28–21. The two teams met again during the regular season two months later, also in Tampa. The Dolphins again prevailed by a score of 23–20, on a 29-yard field goal by Garo Yepremian with 55 seconds left in regulation.

Though they would play only once every three years during the regular season (due to being in different conferences starting in  1977), the two teams agreed to continue an annual preseason matchup. The two teams played each other for four years (1976–1979). Though the game was considered a "meaningless" exhibition game, the young Bucs team were noted for aggressive play, and for "taking the game seriously." With the Buccaneers known at the time for being a poor team ("0–26") of rag-tag rookies, unwanted veterans, and various free agents, the squad often wanted to showcase themselves in the game and show the league they had ability. The intense play hit a climax in 1978, which saw Dolphins starting quarterback Bob Griese go down with a knee injury. He would be sidelined until October, and the incident drew the ire of Dolphins owner Joe Robbie, who decided to put a stop to the preseason series between the two teams.

Of the five meetings in the 1970s (four of which were preseason), Miami won all five games.

1980s
With an ongoing squabble between the respective owners Joe Robbie and Hugh Culverhouse, the teams only met twice in the entire decade of the 1980s during the preseason. Their first matchup of the decade was a regular season meeting during the 1982 strike-shortened season, on Monday Night Football. Miami entered the game 3–0, while the Buccaneers were 0–3. The Bucs jumped out to a 16–3 lead, and intercepted Miami five times, en route to a 23–17 victory. It was Tampa Bay's first ever win over Miami. The result reflected upon the perceived "Tampa Bay Curse", as Miami would go to lose Super Bowl XVII.

In the 1981 season, the respective coaching staffs of Miami and Tampa Bay faced each other in the Pro Bowl at Aloha Stadium. The AFC, led by Miami's head coach Don Shula defeated John McKay's NFC squad by the score of 16–13.

The highest scoring regular season game between the two teams came in 1985. Miami's Dan Marino passed for 302 yards and three touchdown, while Steve DeBerg threw four touchdowns to Jimmie Giles. Miami won 41–38 on a field goal by Fuad Reveiz with six seconds left.

With the Buccaneers mostly uncompetitive during the 1980s, and the infrequent meetings between the two clubs, the rivalry de-intensified during the decade.

1990s
Starting in 1991, the two teams revived their preseason rivalry on a permanent basis. With Wayne Huizenga assuming control of the Dolphins, and Malcolm Glazer later purchasing the Buccaneers, both teams had new ownership and new direction. The two franchises wholeheartedly agreed upon an annual preseason series. The close proximity between the clubs made the decision one of convenience for both the players and fans. Along with the expansion Jacksonville Jaguars, who started play in 1995, the three Florida teams started a fairly regular three-way intrastate preseason rivalry series.

Miami and Tampa Bay did not play during the preseason in 1993 or 1999. The 1995 game was played at a neutral site, the Florida Citrus Bowl in Orlando, with the Bucs serving as the home team.

The two teams played twice during the preseason in 1996. On August 3, 1996, Jimmy Johnson made his debut on the sidelines as coach of the Dolphins, while Tony Dungy coached his first game for Tampa Bay. The Dolphins won the first meeting at Joe Robbie Stadium by a score of 13–10. Three weeks later, the Dolphins swept the two-game series with a 19–7 victory.

In 1997, the two teams played each other for the final time in aging Houlihan's Stadium. The home team Buccaneers prevailed with a score of 24–10 in the preseason, and 31-21 a month later in the regular season.

2000–2002
Tampa Bay and Miami have played nearly every preseason in the 21st century, even during years in which they have been scheduled to play during the regular season.

In 2000, the two teams faced each other in a regular season matchup in mid-December. In a driving rain, with sloppy conditions, Buccaneers kicker Martin Gramatica kicked a 46-yard go-ahead field goal which proved to be the winning margin.

On Monday night, August 13, 2001, the two teams played each other for the first time at Raymond James Stadium, in a preseason opener. Dolphins quarterback Mike Quinn threw a 46-yard "Hail Mary" to Robert Baker as time expired to win by a score of 17–13.

During the preseason opener on Monday night August 12, 2002, the two teams met again at Raymond James Stadium. It served as Jon Gruden's first coached game for the Buccaneers. Frank Murphy took the opening kickoff 95 yards for a touchdown. It was the Buccaneers' fifth kickoff return touchdown in a preseason game, however, at the time, the team had still never returned a kickoff for a touchdown in the regular season (and would do so not until 2007). Tampa Bay would go on to win 14–10.

2005
In 2005, the two teams met in a regular season matchup, a game that drew some controversy in the secondary market of Orlando, Florida. The Buccaneers entered the game in first place with a record of 4–1. The Dolphins were 2–2, and were lauding the anticipated return of Ricky Williams after a year of retirement and a four-game suspension. Due to the complex rules of the NFL television contracts, the Orlando area, well known for having large Dolphins and Buccaneers fanbases, but designated a Jaguars secondary market, was required to instead air a Jacksonville away game during the timeslot. CBS affiliate WKMG lobbied the NFL to reverse the decision and allow the Bucs–Dolphins game to air in Orlando. After several weeks of passionate pleading, the request was denied. Station general manager Henry Maldonado recorded a message for fans that aired just before the broadcast, apologizing for his inability to remedy the situation. In the game, the Buccaneers rolled 27–13, and Williams was not a factor.

2013
They met on Monday Night Football in 2013. Going into the game, considerable media attention focused on the Richie Incognito/Jonathan Martin bullying scandal. In addition, Buccaneers head coach Greg Schiano was considered on the "hot seat" due to a poor 0–8 record. Tampa Bay jumped out to a 15–0 lead, and held on for a 22–19 victory, their first win of the 2013 season. The Buccaneers defense held Miami to only 2 yards rushing, an all-time record low for the Tampa Bay defense, as well as a franchise record low in terms of productivity for the Dolphins' offense.

2016–2020
The annual preseason meeting was not held in 2016, the first time that had happened since 1999. Both clubs were in the middle of offseason stadium renovations. Tampa Bay played their first two preseason games on the road, and Miami also played their first two preseason games on the road (and the third at a neutral site), preventing the two clubs from logistically being able to meet for a matchup.

In 2017, further stadium renovations in Tampa again precluded a preseason meeting between the two clubs. Both teams were scheduled to meet on opening day in Miami anyway, rendering the preseason match less of a priority. However, due to the approaching Hurricane Irma, the game was moved to November 19, the date in which both clubs were originally scheduled for their bye week. Tampa Bay kicked a go-ahead field goal with 4 seconds remaining in regulation to take a 23–20 lead. It appeared briefly it would be the seventh meeting decided by a field goal or less. On the ensuing kickoff, Miami players attempted to lateral the ball, but fumbled it back into their own end zone where it was recovered by Tampa Bay for an improbable touchdown as time expired, and a 10-point victory.

In 2018–2019, the annual preseason meeting was reprised. However, they were not scheduled to meet in the preseason in 2020, and the 2020 preseason was subsequently cancelled outright due to COVID-19.

The most recent regular season meeting occurred on October 10, 2021, featuring former New England Patriots quarterback Tom Brady meeting his former division rivals, the Dolphins. The Buccaneers won this game 45–17.

Game results

Regular season results

Connections between the teams

Coaches/executives

Players

*Offseason and/or practice squad member only

Notes

References

Sources
BucPower.com

See also
National Football League rivalries
Lightning–Panthers rivalry
Fort Lauderdale–Tampa Bay rivalry
Citrus Series
Heat–Magic rivalry

Tampa Bay Buccaneers
Miami Dolphins
National Football League rivalries
American football in Florida
1976 establishments in Florida
Sports rivalries in Florida
Miami Dolphins rivalries
Tampa Bay Buccaneers rivalries